The list of Catalan footballers features male association football players from Catalonia, one of Spain's seventeen autonomous communities and a territory with a population of over 7 million, plus the adjoining Pyrénées-Orientales, a French department, who have reached international status with the national teams as specified, the vast majority representing Spain.

The region has a representative squad – the Catalonia national football team – but they are not recognised by FIFA, were inactive for long periods and only play friendly matches against FIFA teams or against other sides with similar status such as the Basque Country.

Catalonia national team players (since 1997)

Listed below are the players who have featured for the Catalonia international team dating from 1997 when regular fixtures against FIFA national teams were arranged. As of May 2019, there have been 25 matches played in this era (including four against the Basque Country who have the same unofficial status as Catalonia and select their squads on the same basis), with 141 players involved.

Notes

FIFA international players from Catalonia
All of the players listed were either born or raised in Catalonia, with most meeting both criteria.

 Players in bold have won the FIFA World Cup
 Players in underlined have won a continental championships
 Players in italics have won the gold medal at the Olympic Games

Notes

Catalan heritage

There are many other international footballers with some Catalan heritage or connection, for example:

See also
 Catalan Countries
 Catalan football championship
 Catalan Football Federation
 Catalonia national football team
 List of Catalan women's footballers
 List of Basque footballers
 List of FC Barcelona players
 List of Spain international footballers

References

External links
 Spain national team players (with province of birth) at BDFutbol
 List of all Catalan players who have played international football at rsssf.com

List
Catalan
footballers
Catalan
Football in Catalonia
Association football player non-biographical articles
Catalan